The Neon Philharmonic (formed 1967) was an American psychedelic pop band led by songwriter and conductor Tupper Saussy and singer Don Gant.  They released their two albums (The Moth Confesses and the eponymous The Neon Philharmonic) in 1969, and they scored a Top 20 hit on the Billboard Hot 100 chart with "Morning Girl", which featured the Nashville Symphony Orchestra, when it hit the Top 40 in May of that year and rose to number 17 on Billboard and number 15 on the Cash Box chart. The band hit the chart again with "Heighdy-Ho Princess" in 1970. The group was produced by Saussy, Gant, and Bob McCluskey, and engineered by Ronald Gant, Don's brother. The group disbanded in 1975 after releasing numerous non-album singles.  Although the first album stated "Borges Forever!", the group's concertmaster is really named Pierre Menard, and it is not a reference to the Jorge Luis Borges story Pierre Menard, Author of the Quixote, Saussy was not conscious of the connection.

The bulk of the group's output was released by Warner Bros./Seven Arts Records. In 1972, they moved to TRX Records and produced another single, "Annie Poor" / "Love Will Find a Way", after which the group disbanded. The Neon Philharmonic name was sold to producer David Kastle, who put out additional singles released by MCA Records and London Records. At least one Saussy song, "Making Out the Best I Can", was recorded by this group and engineered by Ronald Gant. Along with its flipside recording, "So Glad You're a Woman", written by Ray Williams and Ron Demmans (MCA-40158 (MC 4810), 1975), the instrumentation was limited to synthesizers, guitar and drums. These later singles have no other connection to the original group.

Shaun Cassidy, David's younger brother, did a cover version of "Morning Girl, Later" (simply titled "Morning Girl") in 1976, which did not chart in the US, but did well in The Netherlands, Belgium and Germany. The song was also covered by The Lettermen.

The group is not to be confused with the German group The Neon Philharmonic Orchestra, which arranged many classical pieces in medleys in a similar style in the 1980s and 1990s, and covered Walter Murphy's "A Fifth of Beethoven".

Discography

Albums
The Moth Confesses WS-1769 (January 1969)
The Neon Philharmonic WS-1804 (September 1969)
Brilliant Colors: The Complete Warner Bros. Recordings  (2003)

Singles

Warner Bros.
"Morning Girl" / "Brilliant Colors" (Mono single versions) No. 7621 (January 1969) US Billboard Hot 100 #17, #2 Canada
"No One Is Going to Hurt You" / "You Lied" (Mono single versions) No. 7311 (July 1969)
"Clouds" / "Snow" No. 7355 (November 1969)
"Heighdy-Ho Princess" / "Don't Know My Way Around My Soul" No. 7380 (March 1970)
"Flowers for Your Pillow" / "To Be Continued" No. 7419 (July 1970)
"Something to Believe In" / "A Little Love" No. 7457 (January 1971)
"Got a Feelin' in My Bones" / "Keep the Faith in Me" No. 7497 (May 1971)

Three additional songs, "Better Times," "Jody," and "Letters Crossing" were recorded around the fall of 1970 and remained unreleased until the 2003 collection.

TRX

"Annie Poor" / "Love Will Find a Way" (TRX T-5039, 1972)

MCA
"So Glad You're a Woman" / "Making Out the Best I Can" (MCA-40158 (MC 4810), 1975)

London

 "Long Distance Love Affair" / "Making Out The Best I Can" (L.2577)
 "So Glad You're A Woman" / "Making Out The Best I Can" (L.2584)
 "Bright Lights, Hard Nights" / "She Looked Like A Woman To Me" (L.2598)
 "Lovin' You" / "Don't Look Back" (L.2608)
 "Twice As Strong" / "Don't Look Back" (L.2636)

References

Psychedelic pop music groups
American pop music groups
Warner Records artists